Carex crebriflora, the coastal plain sedge, is a species of flowering plant in the family Cyperaceae, native to Texas and the southeastern United States.

References

crebriflora
Endemic flora of the United States
Flora of Texas
Flora of the Southeastern United States
Plants described in 1922